WNCT (1070 kHz) is an AM radio station broadcasting a beach music format, as "Beach, Boogie and Blues". Licensed to Greenville, North Carolina, United States, the station serves the Greenville-New Bern area.  The station is currently owned by Curtis Media Group Inc.

History
In 1963, Roy H. Park, owner of WNCT-TV, bought WGTC, Greenville's oldest radio station. At the time, the station broadcast at 5,000 watts at 1590 AM. WGTC changed its call letters to the current WNCT two years later. In 1969, WNCT moved to 1070 AM and increased its power to 10,000 watts.

Hinton Media Group programmed WNCT when it was "Talk 1070" and aired its programming on local Cable Channel 7. In 2006, WNCT increased its daytime power to 50,000 watts. The station also became the first AM station in North Carolina to utilize HD radio technology.

By 2008, WNCT aired a contemporary Christian music format.  As of January 5, 2009, the station currently brands itself as "Beach, Boogie and Blues" and plays Carolina Beach Music.

On February 2, 2017, Beasley Media Group announced that it would sell its six stations and four translators in the Greenville-New Bern-Jacksonville, North Carolina market, including WNCT, to Curtis Media Group for $11 million to reduce the company's debt; the deal separated the station from WNCT-FM, which was concurrently divested to Inner Banks Media to comply with FCC ownership limits. The sale was completed on May 1, 2017.

The beach music format began a simulcast on WELS-FM in Kinston on July 1, 2017.

Translators
In addition to the two main stations, WNCT is relayed by an additional 3 translators to widen its broadcast area. The translators are fed by WIKS-HD2.

References

External links
Official Website

NCT
Radio stations established in 1940
1940 establishments in North Carolina